Mohamed Moustapha Mané  (born 19 January 1984 in Dakar) is a retired Senegalese footballer who last played for AS Pikine.

Honours 

 Malaysia Premier League 2007-08 Top Scorers with Kelantan FA -27 goals

References

Living people
Senegalese footballers
1984 births
Expatriate footballers in Thailand
Mohamed Moustapha N'diaye
Expatriate footballers in Vietnam
Association football forwards
Expatriate footballers in Malaysia
Senegalese expatriate sportspeople in Malaysia
Footballers from Dakar
Expatriate footballers in Togo
AS Pikine players
Senegalese expatriate sportspeople in Togo
Senegalese expatriate sportspeople in Thailand
Senegalese expatriate sportspeople in Vietnam
Kelantan FA players